This is a list of female electronic musicians, composers, and sound artists who work in the various genres of electronic music, and the musical groups of which they are members.

A

 Sara Abdel-Hamid (Ikonika)
 Muhsinah Abdul-Karim (Muhsinah)
Gaelle Adisson
 Nina Agzarian (Nina Las Vegas)
 Susan Alcorn
Liset Alea (Etro Anime)
 Nadia Ali
 Dot Allison (Massive Attack, One Dove)
 Fatima Al Qadiri
 Maryanne Amacher
 Muireann Nic Amhlaoibh (Aeons)
 AMWE
 Beth Anderson 
 Laurie Anderson
 Ruth Anderson
 Karin Dreijer Andersson (Fever Ray, The Knife)
 Jessie Andrews
 Leila Arab 
 Mira Aroyo (Ladytron)
 Mathangi Arulpragasam (M.I.A.)
 Tone Åse
 Estelle Asmodelle
 Virginia Astley
 Kaitlyn Aurelia Smith
 Ana-Maria Avram

B
 Jillian Rose Banks (Banks)
 Danielle Baquet-Long (Celer, Chubby Wolf)
 Tahliah Barnett (FKA twigs)
 Elaine Barkin
 Natasha Barrett 
 Françoise Barrière
 Bebe Barron
 Sarah Barthel (Phantogram)
 Julianna Barwick
 Tasha Baxter
 Eve Beglarian
 Shannon Behm (Storm Calysta)
 Anomie Belle
 Lisa Bella Donna
 Sydney Loren Bennett (Syd tha Kyd)
 Ayalah Bentovim (Sister Bliss of Faithless)
 Elizabeth Bernholz  (Gazelle Twin)
 Johanna Magdalena Beyer
 Eithne Ní Bhraonáin (Enya)
 Sara Blackwood (Dubstar)
 Claire Boucher (Grimes)
 Michèle Bokanowski
 Kitty Brazelton
 Fiona Brice
 Phillipa Brown (Ladyhawke)
 Barbara Buchholz
 Kate Bush

C
 Geneviève Calame
 Allison Cameron
 Janet Cardiff
 Wendy Carlos
 Robin Miriam Carlsson (Robyn)
 Caroline Cecil (Whipped Cream)
 Michelle Chamuel
 Maria Chavez
 Cocoa Chanelle
 Sharon Cheslow
 Mary Ellen Childs
 Insook Choi
 Dorit Chrysler
 Suzanne Ciani
 Anne Clark
 Annie Clark (St. Vincent)
 Sonia Clarke (Sonique)
 Jay Clayton
 Christine Clements (Vaccine)
 Alice Cohen
 Beth Coleman
 Maya Jane Coles (Nocturnal Sunshine)
 Nik Colk Void (Factory Floor)
 Juliette Commagere
 Cindy Cox
 Kara-Lis Coverdale
 Romy Madley Croft (The xx)

D
 Dani Deahl
 Constance Demby
 Shikhee D'iordna (Android Lust)
 Nika Roza Danilova (Zola Jesus)
 Marie Davidson
 Camille Davila
 Charlotte de Witte
 Delia Derbyshire
 Daniela Di Lillo (Nora En Pure)
 Marina Diamandis
 Emma Lou Diemer
 Kui Dong
 Suzanne Doucet
 Candida Doyle (Pulp)
 Anne Dudley (Art of Noise)
 Erica Dunham (Unter Null)

E
 Skye Edwards
Hanin Elias
 Kate Elsworth
 Nic Endo
 Liz Enthusiasm (Freezepop)
 Mary Epworth
 Kristin Erickson (Kevin Blechdom)
 Pozzi Escot
 Laura Escudé
 Esthero
 Brooke Evers
 Carolina Eyck

F
 Nanna Øland Fabricius (Oh Land)
 Johanna Fateman (MEN, Le Tigre)
 Maddalena Fagandini
 Beatriz Ferreyra
 Lauren Flax (CREEP)
 Ellen Fraatz (Ellen Allien)
 Aluna Francis (AlunaGeorge)
 Free Dominguez (Kidneythieves)
 Ellen Fullman

G

 Charlotte Gainsbourg
 Diamanda Galas
 Anja Garbarek
 Merrill Garbus (Tune-Yards)
 Katie Geraghty (Koven)
 Stefani Joanne Angelina Germanotta (Lady Gaga)
 Alejandra Ghersi (Arca)
 Beth Gibbons (Portishead)
 Gillian Gilbert (New Order)
 Amber Giles (Mija)
 Miquette Giraudy
 Alice Glass (Crystal Castles)
 Alison Goldfrapp (Goldfrapp)
 Danielle Gooding (Flava D)
 Annie Gosfield
 Cary Grace
 Antye Greie (AGF)
 Ana Simina Grigoriu
 Beverly Grigsby
 Björk Guðmundsdóttir (Björk)
 Hildur Guðnadóttir
 Shilpa Gupta
 Gudrun Gut

H
 Emily Haines
 Laurel Halo
 Ayumi Hamasaki
 Kathleen Hanna (Bikini Kill, Le Tigre, Julie Ruin)
 Elizabeth Vanessa Harper (Class Actress)
 Elizabeth Harris (Grouper)
 Anna-Catherine Hartley (Uffie)
 Miho Hatori (Cibo Matto)
 Sorrel Hays
 Jennifer Heaps (Imogen Heap)
 Heather Heart
Helicopter Girl
 Mara Margaret Helmuth
 Holly Herndon
 Chloé Herry (Clozee)
 Caroline Hervé (Miss Kittin)
 Victoria Christina Hesketh (Little Boots)
Clara Hill
 Joanne Judith-Mary Hill (Sydney Blu)
 Shelley Hirsch
 Mary Ann Hobbes
 Julia Holter
 Yuka Honda (Cibo Matto, Plastic Ono Band)
 Brenda Hutchinson

I
 Susie Ibarra
 Jean Eichelberger Ivey
 Adina Izarra
Ill-esha

J
 Elly Jackson (La Roux)
Samantha James
 Jane Jarboe (Jarboe)
 Joan Jeanrenaud
 Val Jeanty
 Kim Jin-hi
 Danielle Johnson (Computer Magic)
 Ema Jolly (Emika)
 Glynis Jones

K

 Yoko Kanno
 Nil Karaibrahimgil
 Laura Karpman
 Lydia Kavina
 Trish Keenan (Broadcast)
 Bevin Kelley (Blevin Blectum)
 Alicia Keys
 Natasha Khan (Bat for Lashes)
 Morgan Kibby
 Heidi Kilpeläinen (HK119)
 Mari Kimura
 Susanne Kirchmayr (Electric Indigo)
 Judy Klein
 Jutta Koether
 Merja Kokkonen (Islaja)
 Barbara Kolb
 Rachael Kozak (Hecate)
 Nina Kraviz
 Kateryna Kremko (Miss K8)
 Monika Kruse
 Christina Kubisch
 JoAnn Kuchera-Morin
 Pamelia Kurstin

L
 Joan LaBarbara
 Anne LeBaron
 Anne LaBerge
 Martha Ladly (Martha and the Muffins, Associates)
 Jessy Lanza
 Elodie Lauten
 Jennifer Lee (TOKiMONSTA)
 Jonna Lee (iamamiwhoami)
 Kathy Yaeji Lee (Yaeji)
 Victoria Legrand (Beach House)
 Šarlote Lēnmane
 Annie Lennox (Eurythmics)
 Amelie Lens
 Tania Leon
 Jordana LeSesne (1.8.7)
 Elainie Lillios
 Annea Lockwood
 Paige Lopynski (BONNIE X CLYDE)
 Olivia Louvel
 Olivia Lufkin
 Anna Lunoe

M
 Annie MacManus (Annie Mac)
 Georgia Magree (GG Magree)
 Kazu Makino (Blonde Redhead)
 Rekha Malhotra (DJ Rekha)
 Elizabeth Maniscalco (Elizabeth Rose)
 Helen Marnie (Ladytron)
 Carolina Márquez
 Josie Martin (Candyland)
 Miya Masaoka
 Riz Maslen (Neotropic)
 Sachiko Matsubara (Filament, I.S.O. ONJO)
 Keiko Matsui
 Kaffe Matthews
 Agathe Max
 Lauren Mayberry (CHVRCHES, Blue Sky Archives)
 Zia McCabe
 Linda McCartney
 Caralee McElroy (Cold Cave, Xiu Xiu)
 Christina McGeehan (RYAT)
 Priscilla McLean
 Cindy McTee
 Elle Mehrmand
 Rosa Menkman
 Micachu
 Takako Minekawa
 Maria Minerva
 Aira Mitsuki
 Kelela Mizanekristos (Kelela)
 Juana Molina
 Meredith Monk
 Charlotte Moorman (TV Cello)
 Barbara Morgenstern
 Nicole Morier (Electrocute)
 Ikue Mori
 Nicole Moudaber
 Blane Muise (Shygirl)
 Georgia Anne Muldrow
 Róisín Murphy
 Thea Musgrave

N
 Yukimi Nagano (Little Dragon)
 Audrey Napoleon
 Laura Naukkarinen (Lau Nau)
 Amy X Neuburg
 Miriam Nervo (NERVO)
 Olivia Nervo (NERVO)
 Christine Newby (Cosey Fanni Tutti, Throbbing Gristle, Chris & Cosey)
 Dika Newlin
 Chelsea Nikkel (Princess Chelsea)
 Merrill Beth Nisker (Peaches)
 Sarah Nixey
 Tujiko Noriko
 Doris Norton (Jacula)
 Jacqueline Nova

O
 Jocy de Oliveira
 Pauline Oliveros
 Valerie Olukemi A "Kemi" Olusanya (Kemistry)
 Yoko Ono
 Daphne Oram
 Ela Orleans
 Ebony Naomi Oshunrinde (WondaGurl)
 Christine Ott
 Tera de Marez Oyens

P
 Else Marie Pade
 Karin Park
 Andrea Parker (DJ)
 Elizabeth Parker (composer)
 Jennifer Parkin (Ayria)
 Zeena Parkins
 Chantal Passamonte (Mira Calix)
 Maggi Payne
 Annette Peacock
 Sarah Peebles
 Hannah Peel
 Susan Philipsz
 Liz Phillips
 Elizabeth Hayden Pizer
 Lena Platonos
Poe
 Andrea Polli
 Paula P-Orridge
 Valerie Anne Poxleitner (Lights)

R
 Ruth Radelet (Chromatics)
 Éliane Radigue
 Teresa Rampazzi
 Maja Ratkje
 Honey Redmond (Miss Honey Dijon)
 Sally Johnston Reid
 Isabelle Rezazadeh (Rezz)
 Clara Rockmore
 Tara Rodgers
 Samantha Ronson
 Lucie Bigelow Rosen
 Marina Rosenfeld
 Lisa Dawn Rose-Wyatt (Lisa Lashes)
 Olesya Rostovskaya
 Anna Rubin
 Vivian Adelberg Rudow
 Jessica Rylan

S

 Kaija Saariaho
 Lætitia Sadier (Stereolab)
 JD Samson (Le Tigre)
 Charissa Saverio (DJ Rap)
 Carla Scaletti
 Polly Scattergood 
 Marina Schiptjenko
 Cécile Schott (Colleen)
 Martha Schwendener (Bowery Electric)
 Daria Semegen
 Angela Seo (Xiu Xiu)
 Judith Shatin
Lisa Shaw
 Ann Shenton (Add N to (X))
Alice Shields
Alexandra Sholler (Alison Wonderland)
 Kate Simko
 Émilie Simon
 Pril Smiley
 Kaitlyn Aurelia Smith
 Frida Sofía
 Laetitia Sonami
 Martina Sorbara (Dragonette)
 Laurie Spiegel
 Marea Stamper (The Blessed Madonna)
 Bev Stanton (Arthur Loves Plastic)
 Ivana Stefanović
 Lindsey Stirling
 Anne Lilia Berge Strand (Annie)
 Eliot Sumner (Vaal)
 Nicolette Suwoton (Nicolette)
 Kelly Sweet (HALIENE)

T
 Hild Sofie Tafjord
 Mari Takano
 Anna Virginia Taylor (Anna Domino)
 Fiorella Terenzi
 Terre Thaemlitz
 Diane Thome
 Ebony Thomas (Ebony Bones)
 Lynda Thomas
Tracey Thorn (Everything but the Girl)
Lysa Aya Trenier
 Noriko Tsujiko (Tujiko Noriko)
 Cosey Fanni Tutti
 TĀLĀ

U
 Hiromi Uehara
 Ludmila Ulehla

V
 Kristín Anna Valtýsdóttir (múm, Avey Tare & Kría Brekkan)
 Lois V Vierk
 Sarine Voltage

W
 Shirley Walker
 Victoria Beverley Walker (Pinkpantheress)
 Jennifer Walshe
 Alana Watson (NERO)
 Amanda Lucille Warner (MNDR)
 Hildegard Westerkamp
 Tina Weymouth (Tom Tom Club, Talking Heads)
 Ruth White
 Santi White (Santigold)
 Julia Wolfe
 Erykah Wright (Erykah Badu)

X
 Ramona Andra Xavier (Vektroid, Macintosh Plus, New Dreams Ltd, PrismCorp, Laserdisc Visions, 情報デスクVIRTUAL, Sacred Tapestry, Fuji Grid TV, esc 不在, Tanning Salon, dstnt, Vektordrum)
 Sophie Xeon (Sophie)

Y
 Akiko Yano
 Toko Yasuda (St. Vincent)
 Meredith Yayanos
 Yoshimi Yokota (Yoshimi P-We) (Boredoms, OOIOO, OLAibi)
 Ami Yoshida
 suGar Yoshinaga (Buffalo Daughter)
 Gayle Young

Z
 Laurie Z
 Pamela Z
 Kateryna Zavoloka (Zavoloka)
 Marian Zazeela

External links 
 Jon Leidecker and Barbara Golden: Women In Electronic Music 1938-1982, radio show Crack’O’Dawn, 2 parts, aired 1. April 2010 on KPFA FM in Berkeley, USA

References

Electronic